Hans Asplund (16 August 1921 – 8 January 1994) was a Swedish architect. His work was part of the architecture event in the art competition at the 1948 Summer Olympics. Hans Asplund was married in his second marriage to Anne Asplund (born 1937). He is buried at Skogskyrkogården in Stockholm.

References

1921 births
1994 deaths
20th-century Swedish architects
Olympic competitors in art competitions
People from Haninge Municipality